Em-Haley Walker, known professionally as Theia, is an alt-pop artist from New Zealand. In 2016 she released her debut major label single, 'Roam' with her accompanying EP Theia released on 30 June 2017. The EP debuted at No. 15 in New Zealand's Official Top 40, and at No. 3 in the NZ Album Chart. Her second EP Not Your Princess was released on 12 April 2019 and in May 2020 Theia released her 99% Angel mixtape.

Early life
Theia is of Ngāti Tipā and Waikato-Tainui ancestry and was born in Christchurch. She graduated with a Bachelor of Arts from the University of Canterbury in 2012.

Awards and nominations 
In November 2017, Theia was nominated for three awards at the Vodafone New Zealand Music Awards.

She has twice been a finalist in the International Songwriting Competition. In 2020, her song ‘Not Your Princess’ was placed third in the ‘Unpublished’ category. It also received an honorable mention in the ‘Top 40/Pop’ category. Not Your Princess also won Theia second place in Unsigned Only's Pop category.

Discography

Mixtapes

EPs

Singles

As a lead artist

As featured artist

References 

 

Musicians from Christchurch
New Zealand women musicians
Living people
Year of birth missing (living people)
Waikato Tainui people
University of Canterbury alumni